Asesinato en el Senado de la Nación is a 1984 Argentine historical crime drama film directed by Juan José Jusid and written by Carlos Somigliana. It stars José Soriano, Miguel Ángel Solá and Oscar Martínez. It premiered on 13 September 1984 in Buenos Aires. Miguel Ángel Solá won Best Actor for his performance at the Havana Film Festival and Jusid won a Golden Colon for his directorship at the Huelva Latin American Film Festival.

The political film is set in 1930s Argentina. It tells the story of the real-life assassination attempt on politician Lisandro de la Torre by Ramón Valdez Cora.

Synopsis 
In 1935, de la Torre initiated an investigation on the meat trade, which had been previously attempted without success by his fellow party member Julio Noble. In the midst of the investigation, de la Torre's disciple and friend, senator elect Enzo Bordabehere, was murdered, and the province of Santa Fe was intervened. The film chronicles de la Torre's and Bordavere's investigation, as well as the grooming of de la Torre's would-be assassin, Valdez Cora, by corrupt members of the senate, most notably the pro-Nazist Don Alberto.

Cast 
 José Soriano as Lisandro de la Torre
 Miguel Ángel Solá as Ramón Valdés Cora
 Oscar Martínez as Federico Pinedo
 Alberto Segado as Luis Duhau
 Arturo Bonín as Enzo Bordabehere
 Villanueva Cosse as Don Alberto
 Juan Leyrado as Comisario
 Manuel Callau as Soriano
 Marta Bianchi as Rosa
 Selva Alemán as Elvira
 Ana María Picchio as Juanita
 Mónica Galán as Proxeneta

External links 
 

1984 films
1980s Spanish-language films
Films set in 1935
1980s political drama films
Films set in the Infamous Decade
1984 crime drama films
Films shot in Buenos Aires
Films set in Buenos Aires
Argentine crime drama films
1980s Argentine films